MeetYourMakers (MYM or mYm) is a German professional esports organization founded in 2001. It currently has a PlayerUnknown's Battlegrounds team and formerly had teams competing in Battlefield 4, Counter-Strike: Global Offensive, Dota 2, Hearthstone, League of Legends, StarCraft II, and Warcraft III.

History 
Dane Mark and Peter "Mercy" Fries founded MeetYourMakers in 2000, but the organization was not officially established publicly until 2001. In 2002, the decision was made to turn MeetYourMakers into a professional esports organization.

In 2008 MeetYourMakers acquired the "Golden Five" Polish Counter-Strike players: Wiktor "TaZ" Wojtas, Filip "NEO" Kubski, Łukasz "LUq" Wnęk, Mariusz "loord" Cybulski, and Jakub "Kuben" Gurczyński. MeetYourMakers dropped their WarCraft III team in 2009. After the dissolution of their previous League of Legends team, MeetYourMakers acquired EU LCS team Supa Hot Crew on 8 December 2014, playing in the league until it disbanded in mid-2015.

In July 2015, MeetYourMakers was embroiled in controversy after the team's manager threatened to take Marcin "Kori" Wolski's house away as a consequence of him leaving the team.

References

External links 

 
2001 establishments in Germany
Esports teams based in Germany
PlayerUnknown's Battlegrounds teams
Warcraft III teams
Defunct and inactive Counter-Strike teams
Defunct and inactive Hearthstone teams
Former European League of Legends Championship Series teams
Esports teams established in 2001